Muscodor is a genus of fungi in the family Xylariaceae noted for their ability to produce a variety of volatile organic compounds, which inhibit growth of other fungi. The first species to be identified was M. albus. Other known species include M. roseus and M. vitigenus.

Known habitats of Muscodor species include Honduras, Venezuela, Thailand, Brazil, and Australia's Northern Territory. Members of the genus are believed to prefer tropical or monsoonal rainforests as habitats; efforts made to find them in the temperate rainforests of southern Australia and southern Chile have been unsuccessful.

References

New endophytic isolates of Muscodor albus, a volatile-antibiotic-producing fungus

Xylariales